Jephthah's daughter, sometimes later referred to as Seila or as Iphis, is a figure in the Hebrew Bible, whose story is recounted in Judges 11. The judge Jephthah had just won a battle over the Ammonites, and vowed that he would offer the first thing that came out of his house as a burnt offering to Yahweh. However, his only child, an unnamed daughter, came out to meet him dancing and playing a tambourine (v. 34). She encourages Jephthah to fulfill his vow (v. 36) but asks for two months to weep for her virginity (v. 38). After this period of time Jephthah fulfilled his vow and offered his daughter.

The majority opinion among commentators is that Jephthah killed his daughter as an act of human sacrifice. There is, however, a minority opinion that Jephthah's daughter spent the rest of her life in seclusion. This is based on considerations such as weeping for her virginity would make no sense if she were about to die (although it would be sensible in light of the Biblical commandment to "be fruitful and multiply", which she would now no longer be able to fulfill). Commentators holding to the minority view include David Kimhi, Keil and Delitzsch, James B. Jordan, and Jehovah's Witnesses.

Later influence 
Jephthah's daughter was not given a central role in many pre-medieval texts: the major exception being the first-century Liber Antiquitatum Biblicarum of "Pseudo-Philo", which devoted an entire chapter to her (and gave her the name of "Seila"). The French scholar Peter Abelard (d. 1142) praised Seila in his lament Planctus virginum Israel super filia Jephte. In a letter to his lover Héloïse d'Argenteuil, Abelard also portrayed Seila as a model for monastic women who devote their lives to God. In other medieval Christian texts, Jephthah's daughter was portrayed as a type of Virgin Mary and her death was likened to the purification of the Virgin.

During the medieval period, some Jewish communities refrained from drinking water from wells and rivers for a few hours at four key times of the year (a custom called the tekufah). In the twelfth century Rabbi Judah the Pious wrote that the tekufah that fell during the month of Tishre was observed because of Jephthah's daughter.

Jephthah's daughter is called "Adah" by the Order of the Eastern Star and is one of its five heroines, representing obedience to duty.

See also
 List of names for the biblical nameless
Iphigenia

References

Book of Judges people
Filicides
Unnamed people of the Bible
Women in the Hebrew Bible
12th-century BC women